The 2023 Associate international cricket season will be from May to September 2023. All official twenty over matches between Associate members of the ICC are eligible to have full Twenty20 International (T20I) or Women's Twenty20 International (WT20I) status, as the International Cricket Council (ICC) granted T20I status to matches between all of its members from 1 July 2018 (women's teams) and 1 January 2019 (men's teams). The season includes all T20I/WT20I cricket series mostly involving ICC Associate members, that are played in addition to series covered in International cricket in 2023.

Season overview

May

France women in Austria

2023 ICC Women's T20 World Cup Europe Qualifier Division Two

July

2022–23 ICC Men's T20 World Cup Europe Qualifier

August

2022–23 ICC Men's T20 World Cup East Asia-Pacific Qualifier

September

2023 ICC Women's T20 World Cup Europe Qualifier Division One

See also
 International cricket in 2023

References

2023 in cricket